Sardar Singh Randhawa, popularly known as Randhawa, was an Indian Professional wrestler and actor. He was the younger brother of wrestler and actor Dara Singh.

Early life
Randhawa was born in 1933 at Dharmuchakk, a village in Amritsar district, Punjab to Surat Singh and Balwant Kaur.

Career

Wrestling

He started his career in wrestling when he arrived at Singapore in 1952. He had a good build and strong body like his brother. During his career he wrestled with wrestlers like Ski Hi Lee, John da Silva and George Gordienko etc. At the time when Dara Singh became the world champion, Randhawa was the reigning Indian champion.

Films
He got his first break in Awara Abdulla (1963). After that, he did many short roles in films, but mostly negative characters.

Filmography
This is a selected list:-

Personal life
Randhawa was married to Mumtaz's sister Malika and has a son Shaad Randhawa, who is also an actor and a daughter named Shehnaz.

Death
He died on 21 October 2013 at hospital.

References

External links

Male actors in Hindi cinema
Indian male professional wrestlers
20th-century Indian male actors
1933 births
2013 deaths
Indian wrestlers
Punjabi people